Cossulus strioliger is a moth in the family Cossidae. It is found in Iran, Afghanistan, Tajikistan, Uzbekistan and Kyrgyzstan.

References

Natural History Museum Lepidoptera generic names catalog

Moths described in 1893
Cossinae
Moths of Asia